Fictocriticism is a postmodern style of writing which can be described as "Gonzo [in reference to the journalism style] Anthropology". Blending fact and fiction, ethnographic observation, archival history, literary theory and memoir.

Professor Carl Rhodes defines fictocriticism as "a writing engaged in genre-bending as a literary and theoretical engagement with existence and selfhood." It is a new sub-categorization and therefore still being defined and redefined.

The tradition of division among the practices of fiction, theory and criticism into single narrative stories, essays and critiques tend to merge in fictocriticism which combines elements into a single text. These texts thus often tell a story while making an argument. They range from avant-garde prose poetry to discursive meta-fictional inventions.

Once Jacques Derrida asked for a name:
 
We must invent a name for those "critical" inventions which belong to literature while deforming its limits.
The name one could have given him was fictocriticism, but he went on anyway to write, and perform, critically, and sometimes fictionally, for instance by telling stories while making his philosophical arguments.

Fictocriticism might trace its origins to Montaigne, continuing through Barthes and making a different appearance in the New Journalism of Tom Wolfe or Joan Didion. Tending towards the laid-back narrative, the inclusion of the local and singular; the embrace of contemporary culture and media, the name, and the style, have been adopted enthusiastically in Australia and Canada.

Fictocriticism may also take alternative forms, such as art work. Artists such as Patricia Piccinini has been described as operating in a fictocritical dialogue, creating fictional futuristic creatures and companion species of a possible future.

A prominent practitioner of fictocriticism today is Michael Taussig, an anthropologist currently working at Columbia University, who lectures on the subject of fictocriticism extensively.

In popular culture 
The 2015 romantic comedy film Maggie's Plan features two university professors, portrayed by Ethan Hawke and Julianne Moore, who produce fictocritical essays and books.

See also 

Anthropology
Gonzo Journalism
Field Research
Linguistics
 Literary theory
Post Modernism

References 

 
 
 
 Somerville, Margaret (1999) Body/Landscape Journals, Spinifex Press.
 Bartlett, Alison (Summer 2006) 'Dear Regina: formative conversations about feminist writing' FemTAP: A Journal of Feminist Theory and Practice1. 
Anna, Gibbs (April 2005) Fictocriticism, Affect, Mimesis: Engendering Differences. The University of Western Sydney.

External links
 WRT and Fictocriticism
 Processing Fictocriticism
 Fictocriticism - unit description

Literary criticism
Postmodernism